Pat Doherty, short for Patrick Doherty or Patricia  Doherty, may refer to:

 Pat Doherty (boxer) (born 1962), English boxer 
 Pat Doherty (netball) (born 1933), former Australia netball international
 Pat Doherty (politician) (born 1945), Northern Ireland politician

See also
 Patrick Doherty (disambiguation)
 Pat O'Doherty, Australian rugby player